Yuavirus is a genus of viruses in the family Siphoviridae, unassigned to a sub-family. Bacteria serve as the natural host, with transmission achieved through passive diffusion. There are six species in this genus.

Taxonomy
The following species are recognized:
 Alphaproteobacteria virus phiJl001
 Pseudomonas virus LKO4
 Pseudomonas virus M6
 Pseudomonas virus MP1412
 Pseudomonas virus PAE1
 Pseudomonas virus Yua

Structure
Yuaviruses are nonenveloped, with a head and tail. The head is a prolate spheroid about 72 nm by 51 nm. The tail is about 145 nm long.

Genome
All species have been fully sequenced. They range between 58-64k nucleotides, with 77-90 proteins.

Life cycle
The virus attaches to the host cell using its terminal fibers, and ejects the viral DNA into the host periplasm. The DNA genome is circularized or integrate into the host's chromosome before transcription and translation. Once the viral genes have been replicated, the new virions are assembled in the cytoplasm. Finally, the mature virions are released via lysis.

History
According to ICTV's 2012 report, the genus was accepted under the name Yualikevirus, assigned to family Siphoviridae, order Caudovirales. The genus was later renamed to Yuavirus.

References

Siphoviridae
Virus genera